Leslie Ernest Lye (November 18, 1924 – July 21, 2009) was a Canadian actor, comedian, writer, radio personality and announcer and voice artist. He was an original cast member and played numerous roles on the children's program You Can't Do That on Television. He had a television and radio career spanning over half a century.

Early life
Lye was born in Toronto, Ontario and after high school, served a stint in the Canadian Armed Forces, he attended the University of Toronto, earning a Bachelor of Arts degree, and then enrolled in Lorne Greene Academy of Radio Arts.

Radio career
In 1948, he moved to Ottawa, to join Frank Ryan's CFRA talkback team. As a radio announcer, Lye worked with the station's popular groups and was also in demand as an emcee at their many live appearances. After heading back to Toronto to work for a short time at CKEY, he returned to Ottawa and CFRA with his alter ego, Abercrombie. Lye worked with comedian and impersonator Rich Little at the station, and in 1963, they made a comedy album together, called My Fellow Canadians.

Television
Lye turned to the new medium of television in 1958. His first job, as a co-host on the talk show Contact, lasted three years.

In 1961, CJOH-TV went on the air with Lye as a freelance writer and performer. Meanwhile, local entertainer Bill Luxton was busy with several shows, including a morning magazine. Forming what would become a long-lasting partnership, Lye soon began creating comic characters for Bill to interview on his morning show.

When puppeteer John Conway decided to give up hosting the CJOH kids show Cartoonerville in 1966, the station's programmers asked Lye and Luxton to team up and take over. Uncle Willy & Floyd was born. Over the years, such personalities as Klea Scott, Bruno Gerussi and Margaret Trudeau would drop by for surprise guest appearances.  It ran for 22 years in syndication across Canada, and remains the longest-running Canadian syndicated television show in history.

In addition to Luxton, Lye worked with Don Harron, Ruth Buzzi and Orson Bean, and  worked for the CBC, CTV and Global television networks.
Lye is prominently featured in the 2004 independent documentary, You Can't Do That on Film, directed by David Dillehunt.

You Can't Do That on Television
Lye eventually gained international acclaim appearing on You Can't Do That on Television. The Canadian children's show, which was wildly popular in the United States and a staple on Nickelodeon's programming line-up, enjoyed a ten season run from 3 February 1979 to 25 May 1990. Lye, along with Abby Hagyard (who joined the cast in 1982) and Ruth Buzzi, was one of only three adults to ever appear on the show (though Christine McGlade was an adult in her later seasons). As a result, Lye played all the adult male characters, and was the only cast member to appear for the entire series run. His characters included the following:
 Ross Ewich, the show's stage director
 Lance Prevert, a slovenly, drunken, corrupt Canadian senator and father
 Barth, the owner and chef of the worst burger joint ever
 Blip, a greedy arcade owner
 Snake Eyes, a bus driver who always drives his bus into a wall or off a cliff
 Mr. Schidtler, a pompous and sarcastic school teacher with a vague resemblance to Adolf Hitler
 Unnamed school principal, who frequently imposed copying copious numbers of pages from extra-thick books as punishment for minor infractions
 Nasti, the Dungeon Master, a German jailer who is often seen chaining people in a dungeon
 El Capitano, a Latin American military officer in command of a firing squad
 Unnamed doctor/dentist, who has the same glasses, mustache, cigar, and wry sense of humor as Groucho Marx
 Opening and Closing Announcer, "...will not be shown at this time, in its place..."; "You Can't Do That on Television has been a ... production."

Lye's castmates described him as "a legend", an "unsung hero", and "a hoot even when he wasn't on the set".

Animation
In animation, he guest-starred as Samaritan Sneer on an episode of The Raccoons, "Going It Alone!", and appeared as Professor Coldheart in the first two television specials based on the Care Bears franchise, The Care Bears in the Land Without Feelings and The Care Bears Battle the Freeze Machine. In 1987, he became the voice of Quellor on The Adventures of Teddy Ruxpin. Lye also did several different voices on Dennis the Menace for DiC Entertainment as well as supplying voices on three TV specials for Atkinson Film-Arts The Legend of Hiawatha, Babar and Father Christmas and Rumpelstiltskin.

Lifetime achievement
In 2003, Lye and Luxton were honored with lifetime achievement awards from the Alliance of Canadian Cinema, Television and Radio Artists (ACTRA), for their work on Willy & Floyd. Lye continued to work as an active member of the Juvenile Diabetes Research Foundation and was writing a book of his memoirs at the time of his death. 

In September 2019, the City of Ottawa commemorated Lye in a naming ceremony, which reopened one of the theatres in Centrepointe as the Les Lye Studio Theatre.

Death
Lye died in Ottawa, Ontario, after a decade of type-2 diabetes on July 21, 2009. Lye had previously suffered a mild heart attack in 2002. He was survived by his wife of 60 years, Jonni Lye, and his three children, Brett, Daralyn, and Emily.

References

External links

1924 births
2009 deaths
Canadian children's television personalities
Canadian male television actors
Canadian male voice actors
Canadian radio personalities
Canadian sketch comedians
Deaths from diabetes
Male actors from Ottawa
Male actors from Toronto
University of Toronto alumni